The Devils Wrocław were an American football team based in Wrocław, Poland. They played in the Polish American Football League. Devils' American affiliate is Chattanooga Steam from Tennessee. In 2013, they merged with Giants Wrocław forming a new team Panthers Wrocław.

History
The team was founded in May 2005. In 2010, they won the final of the Polish American Football League against The Crew Wrocław. In 2009 the team makes his first appearance at the EFAF Challenge Cup.

Season-by-season records

Honours
 Polish Bowl
 Champions: 2010

References

External links 
 

American football teams in Poland
Sport in Wrocław
American football teams established in 2005
American football teams disestablished in 2013
2005 establishments in Poland
2013 disestablishments in Poland